The 2009 RBS Twenty-20 Cup was the fifth edition of the RBS Twenty-20 Cup, a domestic Twenty20 tournament in Pakistan. It was held in Lahore from 25 to 29 May 2009. The Sialkot Stallions won their fourth overall and consecutive title by defeating the Lahore Lions in the final.

This tournament was held immediately before the 2009 ICC World Twenty20, which Pakistan won.

Results

Teams and standings
The top team from each group qualify for the semi-finals.

 Qualified for semi-finals

Knockout stage

Fixtures

Group stage
Group A

Group B

Group C

Group D

Knockout stage
Semi-finals

Final

Media coverage
 Geo Super (live)

References

External links
Tournament page on ESPN CricInfo
Tournament page on CricketArchive

Domestic cricket competitions in 2008–09
2009 National T20 Cup
2009 in Pakistani cricket
Pakistani cricket seasons from 2000–01